The Diocese of Yopal is a Latin Church ecclesiastical territory or diocese of the Catholic Church in Colombia. It is a suffragan diocese in the ecclesiastical province of the metropolitan Archdiocese of Tunja.

Its cathedra is in the Catedral San José, dedicated to Saint Joseph, in the episcopal see of Yopal, Casanare Department.

History 
 Established on 29 October 1999 as Diocese of Yopal, on reassigned territory split off (like the Apostolic Vicariate of Trinidad) from the suppressed Apostolic Vicariate of Casanare.

Statistics 
, it pastorally served 294,200 Catholics (96.5% of 305,000 total) on 17,725 km² in 31 parishes and 19 missions with 48 priests (41 diocesan, 7 religious), 11 deacons, 23 lay religious (11 brothers, 12 sisters) and 23 seminarians.

Episcopal ordinaries

Bishops of Yopal
''Apostolic Administrator Olavio López Duque, O.A.R. (1999.10.29 – 2001.06.22), Titular Bishop of Strongoli (1977.05.30 – 2013.06.11), former Apostolic Vicar of Casanare (Colombia) (1977.05.30 – retired 1999.10.29) 
 Misael Vacca Ramirez (2001.06.22 – 2017.05.04), also Apostolic Administrator of Diocese of Málaga–Soatá (Colombia) (2015.08.15 – 2016.06.29); next Bishop of Duitama–Sogamoso (Colombia) (2015.04.18 – ...)
 Edgar Aristizábal Quintero (2017.05.04 – ...), previously Titular Bishop of Castra Galbæ (2011.05.04 – 2017.05.04) as Auxiliary Bishop of Archdiocese of Medellin (Colombia) (2011.05.04 – 2017.05.04).

See also
 List of Catholic dioceses in Colombia
 Roman Catholicism in Colombia

References

Sources and external links
 GCatholic.org - data for all sections

Roman Catholic dioceses in Colombia
Roman Catholic Ecclesiastical Province of Tunja
Religious organizations established in 1999
Roman Catholic dioceses and prelatures established in the 20th century
1999 establishments in Colombia